The West End Hose Company Number 3 is a historic two-story brick firehouse located at 15 North Doughty Avenue in the borough of Somerville in Somerset County, New Jersey, United States. The building was added to the National Register of Historic Places on July 17, 2002 for its significance in architecture and social history. The building is currently the Somerville Fire Department Museum operated by the Somerville Exempt Firemen's Association.

History
The firehouse was designed by Somerville architect Jacques Vanderbeck in a Romanesque Revival style and built in 1888. The primary design element is the large arched window on the second level featuring squares of textured glass in several colors. The brick arch over it has a granite keystone with "WEST-END HOSE, 1888". It housed the West End Hose Company until 1970, when the company relocated to a new firehouse. The building then became home to the Somerville Fire Museum.

See also
 National Register of Historic Places listings in Somerset County, New Jersey
 List of museums in New Jersey
 Relief Hose Company No. 2 Engine House

References

External links
 
 

Fire stations on the National Register of Historic Places in New Jersey
Defunct fire stations in New Jersey
Fire stations completed in 1888
Brick buildings and structures
Firefighting museums in the United States
Museums in Somerset County, New Jersey
National Register of Historic Places in Somerset County, New Jersey
Buildings and structures in Somerset County, New Jersey
New Jersey Register of Historic Places
Somerville, New Jersey